MyMichigan Health is aa American non-profit health system, headquartered in Midland, Michigan, affiliated with Michigan Medicine, the health care division of the University of Michigan. MyMichigan Health covers a 23-county region with medical centers in Midland, Alpena, Alma, Clare, Gladwin, Mt. Pleasant, West Branch and Sault Ste. Marie.

In addition to its medical centers, MyMichigan Health also offers both home health care and physician services, and has a strong commitment to medical education. MyMichigan Physicians Group provides urgent care and medical offices in more than 30 specialties and subspecialties. The MyMichigan Health Foundation supports patients and families served by MyMichigan Health by raising funds for equipment, services and programs. Currently, MyMichigan Health has more than 8,700 employees, volunteers and physicians.

Community benefit
During the fiscal year 2018, MyMichigan Health contributed $106.1 million towards community benefit initiatives across a 23-county region. The calculation of the contributions includes charity care for uninsured and the financially needy as well as unreimbursed costs for providing care for those insured through Medicare and Medicaid. Also included is support of medical education, medical research, health promotion efforts and community education.

Leadership
Diane Postler-Slattery replaced Richard Reynolds as president and CEO in early 2013. She was formerly president and COO of Aspirus Wausau Hospital in Wisconsin. 
 Richard (Rick) Reynolds assumed system leadership in 2008 and was instrumental in launching the open heart surgery program in Midland and the affiliation with Michigan Medicine.
Terence (Terry) F. Moore was the health system executive from its founding in 1984 until his retirement in 2008. As of 2020, he continues to be active in area business development efforts and operates a local apple orchard. Moore is the author or co-author of ten books on hospital administration and leadership.

History
MyMichigan Health was formed by the affiliation of hospitals in Midland and Clare in 1984. The hospital in Gladwin, Michigan, became an affiliate the following year. The hospital in Alma, became a wholly owned subsidiary in 2004. The system's early history is documented in the book A Journey of Caring by Dorthy Langdon Yates.

In August 2012, MyMichigan Health announced it was in negotiations to affiliate with the University of Michigan Health System. The partnership was finalized in June, 2013. The University of Michigan Health System acquired a minority ownership stake in MyMichigan Health and two seats on the 17-member board of directors. The affiliation better positioned both organizations for anticipated health care reform.

MyMichigan Health provides consulting services to Mackinac Straits Health System although plans for acquisition of the critical access hospital in St. Ignace fell through in mid-2014. In early 2015, the system announced that it was divesting itself of its two nursing homes, MidMichigan Stratford Village and MidMichigan Gladwin Pines, a transaction that was completed the following year. During the same timeframe MidMichigan acquired Alpena Regional Medical Center and changed its name to MyMichigan Medical Center - Alpena. West Branch Regional Medical Center (formerly Tolfree Memorial Hospital) joined MyMichigan Health as its sixth acute care hospital in 2018. It was renamed MyMichigan Medical Center-West Branch.

On December 1, 2021, MidMichigan Health became MyMichigan Health as part of a system-wide brand transformation updating the health system and facility names, and logo.

Medical centers

References

External links
MyMichigan Health website
ConnectCare, the managed care division of MyMichigan Health

Healthcare in Michigan
Hospital networks in the United States